Major-General Simon Charles Hetherington,  was a Canadian Army officer who served as the commander of the Canadian Army Doctrine and Training Centre, 3rd Canadian Division, and the 2nd Regiment, Royal Canadian Horse Artillery.

Military career 

He served in Afghanistan on multiple tours where he would command the Kandahar Provincial Reconstruction Team (KPRT) and as the deputy commander of Joint Task Force Afghanistan.

He was made the commander of the 3rd Canadian Division based out of Edmonton in 2016.

In 2017, he was promoted to Major-General and was made the commander of the Canadian Army Doctrine and Training Centre.

References 

Canadian Army officers